The Ark-Tex Council of Governments (ARK-TEX) is a voluntary association of cities, counties and special districts in Northeast Texas and Miller County, Arkansas.

Based in Texarkana, the Ark-Tex Council of Governments is a member of the Texas Association of Regional Councils.

Counties served
Bowie
Cass
Delta
Franklin
Hopkins
Lamar
Morris
Red River
Titus
Miller County, Arkansas

Largest cities in the region
Texarkana, Texas
Texarkana, Arkansas
Paris
Sulphur Springs
Mount Pleasant
Atlanta

References

External links
Ark-Tex Council of Governments - Official site.

Texarkana
Texarkana metropolitan area
Texas Association of Regional Councils